Filby is a village and civil parish in the English of Norfolk.

History
Filby's name is of mixed Anglo-Saxon and Viking origin deriving from an amalgamation of the Old English and Old Norse for Fili's or Fila's settlement.

In the Domesday Book, Filby is listed as a settlement of 48 households in the hundred of East Flegg. In 1086, the village was divided between the East Anglian estates of William de Warenne, Roger Bigod, St Benet's Abbey, William d'Ecouis and Rabel the Engineer.

Filby Hall is a manor-house dating from the Eighteenth Century with a significant remodelling in the Nineteenth Century in the Victorian Gothic style. The Hall is surrounded by walled gardens with a rare example of a Nineteenth Century summerhouse in the Orangery. During the Second World War, the hall was used as a camp for the British Army.

Geography
According to the 2011 Census, Filby has a population of 765 residents living in 328 households.

Filby falls within the constituency of Great Yarmouth and is represented at Parliament by Brandon Lewis MP of the Conservative Party. For the purposes of local government, the parish falls within the district of Great Yarmouth.

All Saints' Church
Filby's parish church was largely constructed in the Fourteenth Century with the tower being completed by the Sixteenth Century, the church was also significantly restored in the Nineteenth Century. All Saints' is one of Norfolk's few remaining churches with a thatched roof with the font built from Purbeck Marble dating from the Thirteenth Century. The stained-glass largely dates from the Nineteenth Century and originates from the workshops of Alfred Gerente of Paris, Ward and Hughes and James Powell and Sons.

Filby Broad

Filby Broad is one of the five Trinity Broads and is a Site of Special Scientific Interest with many uncommon species of birds and other wildlife. The broad is fairly shallow, reaching only six to eight feet at its deepest.

Amenities
The majority of local children attend Filby Primary School, which was awarded a 'Good' rating by Ofsted in 2013 which was upheld in 2017. The school is part of the Evolution Academy Trust.

Filby has a strong community ethos, and in 2002 won the 'Small Village' category in the Britain in Bloom competition.

References

External links

Villages in Norfolk
Borough of Great Yarmouth
Civil parishes in Norfolk